Mickiewicz is a crater on Mercury. Its name was adopted by the International Astronomical Union (IAU) in 1976. Mickiewicz is named for the Polish poet Adam Mickiewicz, who lived from  1798 to 1855.

Hollows are abundant in the area of the central peak complex of this crater.

Views

References

Impact craters on Mercury